Robyn Creswell is an American critic, scholar and translator.

Life 
He graduated from Brown University in 1999 and gained a doctorate in comparative literature from New York University in 2011. In addition to teaching comparative literature at Brown University, he also serves as poetry editor of the Paris Review. Creswell's specialization is contemporary Arabic literature.

He has translated several literary works from the Middle East, including That Smell and Notes from Prison by Sonallah Ibrahim and The Clash of Images by Abdelfattah Kilito, and has written numerous essays for various literary periodicals. A revised version of his thesis Tradition and Translation: Poetic Modernism in Beirut (2012) was published by Princeton University Press as City of Beginnings: Poetic Modernism in Beirut (2019).

Creswell won the 2013 Roger Shattuck Prize for Criticism, awarded by the Center for Fiction.

Bibliography

Books 
 
Contributor to A New Divan: A Lyrical Dialogue Between East and West (Gingko Library, 2019). 
Translations
 Abdelfattah Kilito. The clash of images, London: Darf Publishers, 2010. 
Sonollah Ibrahim. That smell and notes from prison. New Directions, 2013. 
Abdelfattah Kilito. The tongue of Adam. New Directions, 2015.

Book reviews

References

Living people
Year of birth missing (living people)
American translators
Brown University alumni
The New York Review of Books people
New York University alumni